The 1905–06 Isthmian League season was the first in the history of the Isthmian League, an English football competition.

London Caledonians emerged as champions.

League table

References

External links
Official website

Isthmian League seasons
1905–06 in English association football leagues